Bost-Burris House, also known as the Elias Burris House, is a historic home located near Newton, Catawba County, North Carolina. It was built about 1810, and is a two-story, hall-and-parlor plan, frame dwelling. It is three bays wide and has an exterior end stone chimney.  It has a -story ell dated to the late-1860s, and a one-story ell from the late-1890s.  The interior retains Federal style design elements from its original construction.

It was listed on the National Register of Historic Places in 1990.

References

Houses on the National Register of Historic Places in North Carolina
Houses completed in 1810
Federal architecture in North Carolina
Houses in Catawba County, North Carolina
National Register of Historic Places in Catawba County, North Carolina